Ezequiel Bitok (born 15 February 1966) is a retired Kenyan runner.

Achievements

References

External links

1966 births
Living people
Kenyan male long-distance runners
Kenyan male marathon runners
Olympic athletes of Kenya
Athletes (track and field) at the 1996 Summer Olympics
Kenyan male cross country runners